Okay is a town along the east bank of the Verdigris River in Wagoner County, Oklahoma, United States. The population was 620 at the 2010 census, a 3.9 percent increase over the figure of 597 recorded in 2000.

Etymology and history
Okay's history as a community began circa 1806, when a French trader named Joseph Bogy established a trading post in the Three Forks area of what would eventually become the state of Oklahoma.  The firm of Brand and Barbour took over the post later. When Barbour died in 1822, A. P. Chouteau, who had already established a trading post at Salina bought the Three Forks post. At the time, the post included twelve houses and a ferry. Chouteau expanded his business by bringing in Creole carpenters to construct keelboats that local traders needed to transport the goods they obtained from the local Indians to New Orleans and St. Louis. For a while, the Osage tribe claimed ownership of the land, which they ceded to the Western Cherokees before the Trail of Tears. Then the Western Creeks were allowed to settle on part of the land. In 1828, the Federal Government bought Chouteau's land for construction of a Creek Agency.

The settlement had various names before 1919. The St. Louis, Iron Mountain and Southern Railway called a nearby switch Coretta, and the US Post Office adopted the name in 1891. The Cook Gang robbed the train at Coretta on 1894. The name Falls City was also current, from nearby rapids on the Verdigris River. The post office name changed to Rex in 1900 and North Muskogee in 1911. The name Okay was adopted on 18 October 1919 after the "O. K. Trucks" brand of oil tankers made at a factory built there in 1915 by the Oklahoma Auto Manufacturing Company, which later renamed itself the "O. K. Truck Manufacturing Company". Okay has been noted for its unusual place name.

A fire destroyed most of the business district in 1936, including two general stores, a church, the post office, and two vacant buildings. Only two businesses, a filling station and a blacksmith shop, survived the disaster.

Geography

Demographics

As of the census of 2000, there were 597 people, 227 households, and 165 families residing in the town. There were 278 housing units at an average density of 343.3 per square mile (132.5/km2). The racial makeup of the town was 64.15% White, 4.36% African American, 21.27% Native American, 0.17% Asian, 0.50% Pacific Islander, 1.84% from other races, and 7.71% from two or more races. Hispanic or Latino of any race were 3.69% of the population.

There were 227 households, out of which 35.2% had children under the age of 18 living with them, 48.9% were married couples living together, 18.1% had a female householder with no husband present, and 26.9% were non-families. 23.8% of all households were made up of individuals, and 10.6% had someone living alone who was 65 years of age or older. The average household size was 2.63 and the average family size was 3.11.

In the town, the population was spread out, with 30.7% under the age of 18, 8.0% from 18 to 24, 25.6% from 25 to 44, 23.8% from 45 to 64, and 11.9% who were 65 years of age or older. The median age was 36 years. For every 100 females, there were 97.0 males. For every 100 females age 18 and over, there were 92.6 males.

The median income for a household in the town was $20,385, and the median income for a family was $23,472. Males had a median income of $21,000 versus $14,444 for females. The per capita income for the town was $9,758. About 26.2% of families and 27.8% of the population were below the poverty line, including 31.9% of those under age 18 and 34.2% of those age 65 or over.

Education
According to the Huffington Post, the Okay Public School Board of Education has instituted a policy of allowing teachers to have guns in their schools. On February 1, 2016, the signs that had read, "Gun Free School Zone," were replaced by signs reading, "Attention. Please be aware that certain staff members at Okay Public Schools can be legally armed and may use whatever force is necessary to protect our students."

Superintendent Charles McMahan was quoted as saying that, "No specific incident caused us to pass this policy. ...With everything that is going on in the world, we've heard that you may possibly see more attacks from radical groups looking for children." McMahan pointed out that Okay has only one police officer. Other law enforcement officers can respond from Wagoner, Oklahoma in about 10 minutes.  He added that about five percent of the Okay teachers are armed.

Teachers participating in the program must have a concealed carry permit, a certificate from Oklahoma's Council on Law Enforcement Education and Training,  a psychiatric evaluation and take a shooting course three times a year. They must carry their own guns (45 caliber or less), or keep them in a locked box at school. The policy also requires the armed teachers wear an identifying badge, hat or jacket.

Notable people
 Lou Henson, born in Okay in 1932. He is a former NCAA Division I college basketball coach and a member of the National Collegiate Basketball Hall of Fame.
 Katie Rain Hill, transgender writer and activisit

Notes

References

Towns in Oklahoma
Towns in Wagoner County, Oklahoma
1919 establishments in Oklahoma